Dorothy Hamilton Brush (14 March 1894 – 4 June 1968) was a birth control advocate, women's rights advocate and author. She worked with Margaret Sanger and the birth control movement and wrote plays, travel articles, and books (the latter with Walter S. Hayward.)

Early life and education 
Dorothy Hamilton Brush was born on March 14, 1894, to Walter James Hamilton, a lawyer, and Mary Jane Adams. She had two sisters, Gladys and Margaret, the latter of whom went on to become an actress most famous for portraying the Wicked Witch of the West in The Wizard of Oz. They grew up in Cleveland and Brush went to school at the Hathaway Brown School. 

Brush attended Smith College where she was very active, serving as a delegate to the YWCA Silver Bay Camp in New York, as a house president, and as a Student Adviser. She also participated in a number of clubs and societies, including the Alpha Society, Il Tricolore, Blue Pencil, and the Debating Union. She wrote short stories and other works and served on the editing staff for a variety of college publications such as the Monthly Board, the Weekly Board, and the Class Book Board. During her junior year Brush was the class historian. She wrote the "History of Junior Year" for her class in the 1917 yearbook, as well as the words for the Ivy Song and for "Alma Mater."

She graduated from Smith College in 1917.

Career 

While Brush's first husband, Charles, was serving in the Ordinance Officers' Reserve Corp of the Army as a first lieutenant from 1917 to 1919, Dorothy worked for various charities in Washington, D.C., and then in Sheffield, Alabama. In 1919 Charles and Dorothy embarked on a round-the-world trip that included a stop in Honolulu, Hawaii, and then returned to the United States to settle in the Cleveland, Ohio area where Charles established the Brush Research Laboratory.

Beginning in 1922 Brush volunteered for the Junior League in the Cleveland area. Her work in a prenatal clinic led to her increased awareness, and advocacy, of women's health issues and birth control. Along with several friends and supporters, Brush played a large part in the establishment of the Maternal Health Association in 1928, the precursor to Planned Parenthood of Cleveland, established in 1966.

After the death of her first husband, Dorothy donated funds and opened the Maternal Health Association (MHA) in 1928, a project which she and others had been planning since 1921. MHA later became the Planned Parenthood of Greater Cleveland. In 1929 her father-in-law, inventor Charles F. Brush, Sr., appointed Dorothy to the Board of Managers of his newly created Brush Foundation.

Dorothy Brush continued her work with the Maternal Health Association but also became increasingly involved with the Foundation, serving as an administrator and later as Chairman from 1957 to 1963. The Brush Foundation still exists and has broadened its mission to include research and education on a wide variety of birth control issues.

Work with Margaret Sanger 
Brush volunteered in Sanger's clinic and later in the 1930s traveled with her throughout Asia and Europe as a missionary for birth control and family planning. Brush placed great value on Sanger's work and, as a Smith College alumna, knew about the Sophia Smith Collection (SSC) and its collecting efforts in women's history. She wrote to Margaret Storrs Grierson, director of the SSC, in 1946 and together they convinced Sanger to donate her papers to Smith (portions of her professional papers were already given to the Library of Congress). Brush was also instrumental in Sanger's receiving an Honorary Doctor of Laws degree from Smith College in 1949 and led the effort to nominate her for a Nobel Prize.

Even as her work with Margaret Sanger and the birth control movement became a central focus, Brush continued her writing. She co-wrote (using her maiden name Dorothy Adams Hamilton) with Walter S. Hayward the books, The American People: A Popular History of the United States, 1865-1941 (1943) and Your Land and My Land: The American People from Lincoln to Roosevelt (1943). Brush also wrote travel articles for the magazine World Traveller and a few children's plays for the Samuel French Company that were published in the late 1920s. In addition to these published materials, Brush also authored a number of manuscripts on women in Japan, Margaret Sanger, birth control, and on menopause that were never published.

In 1952 Sanger and Brush saw the fruit of their work in the international birth control movement with the establishment of the International Planned Parenthood Federation. Also in 1952 Brush started the IPPF newsletter, Around the World News of Population and Birth Control, which received funding from the Brush Foundation, and she served as its editor until 1956. Although she had intended to retire at this point in part due to health problems, in 1957 Brush agreed to serve as Honorary Advisor for Field Work Services. Many field offices faced political and legal obstacles in continuing their work with family planning and birth control, and Brush and the rest of the field officers helped to support their efforts by locating funding, recruiting volunteers, and generally providing solid, reliable information. Brush continued this work for 4 years, finally retiring in 1961.

In the early 1960s Brush spent an increasing amount of time at Sanger's home in Arizona due to Sanger's failing health, assisting her until Sanger died in 1966. Brush suffered herself during these years and many years before from emphysema and other maladies, and her travel and activities were often restricted.

Personal life 
In 1917 Brush married her first husband, Charles Francis Brush, Jr., son of Charles Brush, the creator of a new arc lamp and lighting system and founder of Brush Electric, which later merged with two other companies to become General Electric. Their first child, Jane, was born in 1920 and their second child, Charles III, was born in 1923. In May 1927 Brush's six-year-old daughter Jane became ill with pneumonia and needed a blood transfusion, for which her father Charles had volunteered to donate his blood. Jane did not recover and died, and Charles suffered complications from the transfusion, dying a week later.

In 1929, Brush married Alexander Colclough Dick and they moved to New York City. In 1930 their daughter Sylvia was born. In 1947, the pair divorced.

In 1962, Brush married Dr. Lewis C. Walmsley, an educational missionary and Professor at the University of Toronto whom she had first met in 1937 through Margaret Sanger.

Death 
Dorothy Brush died on June 4, 1968.

Honors 
Because of her continued work with and dedication to Smith College, Brush was awarded a Smith College Medal in October 1967. The medal noted her tireless work with family planning and women's health, her unfailing support of Margaret Sanger, and her numerous contributions to the Sophia Smith Collection and Smith College.

Works

Plays 

 One-Eye, Two-Eye and Three-Eye: A Puppet Play for Children in Three Acts (1929) New York: Samuel French
 The Poor Little Turkey Girl: A Play of Pueblo Indian Folk-Lore (1928) New York: Samuel French

Books 

 The American People: A Popular History of the United States, 1865 - 1941 (1943) New York: Sheridan House [with Walter Sumner Hayward]
 Your Land & My Land: The American People from Lincoln to Roosevelt (1943) New York: Sheridan House [with Walter Sumner Hayward]

References

External links 
Dorothy Hamilton Brush Papers at the Sophia Smith Collection, Smith College Special Collections

1894 births
1968 deaths
American women's rights activists
American birth control activists
American feminists
20th-century American women writers
Smith College alumni